The 2005–06 Queensland Roar season would mark the first season for the Hyundai A-League. Queensland Lions withdrew their first team from the QLD State League and entered it in the new fledgling competition as ‘The Roar’ having been accepted by Football Federation Australia to take part as the sole representative for Queensland after no other club was able to raise the required funds to participate. The Queensland Roar were previously playing in the Brisbane Premier League under the name Queensland Lions.

2005–06 season
The Queensland Roar made their A-League debut against the now-defunct New Zealand Knights, in a 2–0 win in front of over twenty thousand fans at their home ground of Suncorp Stadium. Unfortunately, the Roar were mediocre in the next rounds and after a series of draws and losses would not record their next win until Round 6 against the Newcastle Jets. The rest of the 2005–06 season would follow in a similar fashion as after 21 rounds of the regular season the Roar finished with seven wins, seven draws and seven losses, placing them sixth on the ladder from eight teams.
It has been said the Roars first season in the inaugural A-League was more successful off-field than on.

The club was the first to have 100,000 spectators pass through the gates and overall had the second highest attendance for the season (148,609) and despite failing to qualify for the finals, the club's home attendance was the second highest in the opening season (average 14,860 a game). Despite the clubs average win–loss record the club had a number of highlights throughout the year, notably the season's equal highest scoring win (5–0 over the Newcastle Jets in Round 20) and striker Alex Brosque being one of four A-League players awarded the Reebok Golden Boot Award for Top Scorer of the Year with 8 goals.

Inaugural A-League squad

Season 2005–06 results
Round 1

Round 2

Round 3

Round 4

Round 5

Round 6

Round 7

Round 8

Round 9

Round 10

Round 11

Round 12

Round 13

Round 14

Round 15

Round 16

Round 17

Round 18

Round 19

Round 20

Round 21

Season 2005–06 ladder

Notes and references

2005-06
Queensland Roar Season, 2005-06